The Annie Award for Directing in an Animated Television/Broadcast Production is an Annie Award given annually to the best animated direction in animated television or broadcast productions. Directing for television productions was first recognized at the 24th Annie Awards alongside feature film in the Best Achievement in Directing, though the next year a separate category would be created resulting in two directing categories, one for television/broadcasting productions and another for animated feature films.

Winners and nominees

1990s
 Best Achievement in Directing

 Best Individual Achievement for Directing in a TV Production

2000s
 Outstanding Achievement for Directing in a Television Production

2010s

2020s

References

External links 
 Annie Awards: Legacy

Annie Awards
Annie